The 53rd (Welsh) Infantry Division was an infantry division of the British Army that fought in both the First and Second World Wars. Originally raised in 1908 as the Welsh Division, part of the Territorial Force (TF), the division saw service in First World War, being designated 53rd (Welsh) Division in mid-1915, and fought in the Gallipoli Campaign and in the Middle East. Remaining active in the Territorial Army (TA) during the interwar period as a peacetime formation, the division again saw action in Second World War, fighting in North-western Europe from June 1944 until May 1945.

The 53rd Division was temporarily disbanded at the end of the war, but was reactivated in 1947 when the Territorial Army was reformed and reorganised. In 1968 the division was finally deactivated, but its 160th Brigade remains in service today. As the name suggests, the division recruited mainly in Wales, but also in Herefordshire, Shropshire and Cheshire.

Formation
The Territorial Force (TF) was formed on 1 April 1908 following the enactment of the Territorial and Reserve Forces Act 1907 (7 Edw.7, c.9) which combined and re-organised the old Volunteer Force, the Honourable Artillery Company and the Yeomanry.  On formation, the TF contained 14 infantry divisions and 14 mounted yeomanry brigades.  One of the divisions was the Welsh Division. In peacetime, the divisional headquarters was, from 1909, at 3 Belmont in Shrewsbury.

First World War
The Welsh Division was mobilised upon Britain's entrance into the First World War in early August 1914.

In 1915, the Welsh Division was numbered as the 53rd (Welsh) Division and the brigades became, respectively, the 158th (North Wales) Brigade the 159th (Cheshire) Brigade and the 160th (Welsh Border) Brigade. Some original battalions were detached early in the First World War to reinforce other divisions.

The division sailed from Devonport, bound for Gallipoli via Imbros (now Gökçeada) on 19 July 1915 and landed at Suvla Bay on the Gallipoli Peninsula on 9 August 1915. The division was evacuated from Gallipoli during December 1915 and moved to Egypt. The evacuation was forced by a combination of combat, disease and harsh weather which saw the division reduced to just 162 officers and 2,428 men, approximately 15% of full strength.

On 26 March 1917, the 53rd (Welsh) Division bore the brunt of the First Battle of Gaza where the three brigades, along with the 161st (Essex) Brigade of the 54th (East Anglian) Division, had to advance across exposed ground, withstanding shrapnel, machine gun and rifle fire, to capture the Turkish fortifications. Despite gaining the advantage towards the end of the day, the British commander, Lieutenant-General Philip Chetwode called off the attack so that the division's casualties, were suffered in vain.

Other division actions included the Battle of Romani in August 1916, the Battle of El Buggar Ridge in October 1917 and the action of Tell 'Asur in March 1918.

Between the wars
The division was disbanded after the war, along with the rest of the Territorial Force which was reformed in the 1920s as the Territorial Army, and created on a similar basis to the Territorial Force and the 53rd Division was reformed. The division saw a great change in its units between the wars.

Second World War

1939
The Territorial Army and the 53rd (Welsh) Division, commanded by Major-General Bevil Wilson serving under Western Command, was mobilised on 1 September 1939, the day the German Army invaded Poland, and two days later the Second World War officially began. The early days of the war for the 53rd Division were spent in training the divisions' 2nd Line duplicate, the 38th (Welsh) Infantry Division, created earlier in the year, and containing many former members and much equipment, of the 53rd Division. In October, just over a month after the war began, most of the 53rd Division was sent to Northern Ireland, coming under command of British Troops Northern Ireland.

1940–1941

After the British Expeditionary Force (BEF) in France and Belgium was evacuated from Dunkirk in mid-1940, the threat grew of a German invasion of Northern Ireland. The 61st Infantry Division arrived to help defend it, with the 53rd Division charged with responsibility for the southern half of Ulster and the 61st Division the northern. The divisions came under the command of III Corps. In March 1941, the garrison was reinforced with the 5th Infantry Division, a Regular Army formation that had fought in France in 1940. The 53rd Division took part in many exercises, training by battalion, brigade, division and corps level. "It was a very different 53rd Division which returned to near its own countryside in November 1941, from the comparatively untrained one which had moved to Ireland in driblets between October 1939 and April 1940." The 53rd Division, now commanded by Major-General Gerard Bucknall, returned to the Welsh Border counties again in November 1941, with the divisional HQ based in Whitchurch, Shropshire.

1942–1943
The division was again serving under Western Command. In April 1942 the division was sent to defend Kent in South-Eastern Command, under Lieutenant-General Bernard Montgomery, between 1942–1943, joining XII Corps ready to defeat a German invasion (Operation Sea Lion), serving with the 43rd (Wessex) Infantry Division and 46th Infantry Division. The 53rd Division was later earmarked to form part of the Second Army for the invasion of Europe.

In September 1942, the division received a new GOC (General Officer Commanding), Major-General Robert Knox "Bobby" Ross, an officer of the Queen's Royal Regiment (West Surrey) who arrived to replace Major-General Gerard Bucknall. Like most senior British commanders of the Second World War, he was a veteran of the Great War, where he had been awarded the Distinguished Service Order and the Military Cross. Before promotion to command of the 53rd, he had commanded the 160th Infantry Brigade and before that, the 2nd Battalion, Queen's Royal Regiment in Palestine. He commanded the 53rd (Welsh) Division until August 1945, training the division to a very high standard in England and Kent and leading it throughout the campaign in North-west Europe.

On 17 May 1942 the 53rd (Welsh) Division was reorganised, its 159th Infantry Brigade detaching to help form the 11th Armoured Division (The Black Bull), with the 31st Tank Brigade taking its place as part of an experiment with New Model Divisions (or Mixed Divisions) of one tank brigade and two infantry brigades. The experiment was abandoned in late 1943, being judged unsuitable for the terrain in North-western Europe and the 31st Tank Brigade was replaced by the 71st Infantry Brigade (containing the 1st East Lancashire Regiment, 1st Oxfordshire and Buckinghamshire Light Infantry and 1st Highland Light Infantry, nicknamed the Foreign or International Brigade) from the disbanded 42nd Armoured Division, in October. The division spent the remaining period in the build-up to the invasion of Normandy in intensive training.

1944–1945

After several years of training, the 53rd (Welsh) Division landed in Normandy on 28 June 1944 (although a small detachment from no.2 Platoon arrived on 12 June including Norman Branch), the second last British infantry division to land and was placed under command of XII Corps, defending the Odon Valley position. The division was involved in much fighting in this area, with the 158th Brigade detached to fight with the 15th (Scottish) Infantry Division in the Second Battle of the Odon (Operation Greenline) before Operation Goodwood in mid-July. In August it began to push beyond the Odon and crossed the river Orne, helping to close the Falaise Pocket. It was during this fighting that Acting Captain Tasker Watkins, Officer Commanding (OC) B Company of the 1/5th Battalion, Welch Regiment was awarded the Victoria Cross, the first and only to be awarded to the regiment and division during the war, as well as the only Welshman of the British Army during the Second World War to be awarded the VC.

On 2 August, the GOC, Major-General Ross, decided that due to the casualties suffered by the division in Normandy and an acute lack of infantry replacements, the battalions of 158th Brigade (the 4th, 6th and 7th Battalions of the Royal Welch Fusiliers) were replaced and sent to other brigades of the division, the 4th RWF transferring to 71 Brigade and 6th RWF to 160 Brigade while the 7th RWF remained in 158 Brigade. "It was found that with three Battalions of one Regiment in the same Brigade – as in the case of the 158th Brigade with its three Battalions of Royal Welch Fusiliers – difficulties were experienced in providing reinforcements in the event of heavy casualties. This was particularly so with Officer reinforcements." (Curiously though, this did occur with the 131st (Queen's) Brigade of the 7th Armoured Division). By 31 August 1944 the 53rd (Welsh) Division had suffered many casualties; in just over two months of fighting 52 officers and 533 other ranks were killed, 145 officers were wounded, 18 missing, 2,711 other ranks wounded and 360 missing for a total of 3,819 casualties. The division had managed to capture over 3,800 prisoners of war (POWs).

The division took part in the Swan (swift advance) to Belgium where much fighting took place to secure an important bridgehead at the Junction Canal near Lommel. The 53rd Division then fought hard to expand the salient south of Eindhoven in conjunction with the Operation Market Garden, which ended in failure due to events at the Battle of Arnhem in late September, where the British 1st Airborne Division was virtually destroyed in severe fighting. Advancing into the Netherlands, 53rd (Welsh) Division liberated the city of 's-Hertogenbosch in four days of heavy fighting from 24 October.

In December 1944, attached to XXX Corps, it was one of the British divisions that took part in the mainly American Battle of the Bulge, helping to cut off the northern tip of the German salient. For the next few weeks, the division absorbed large numbers of replacements and trained the newcomers. Still with XXX Corps, which was attached to the First Canadian Army, it was later sent north in front of the Siegfried Line to take part in Operation Veritable (the Battle of the Reichswald Forest) in February 1945 where the division, supported by Churchill tanks of the 34th Armoured Brigade, was involved in some of the fiercest fighting of the campaign thus far, against determined German paratroopers and fighting in terrain similar to that found at Passchendaele 27 years before but with the addition of the cold of "winter rain, mud and flooding", where the mud was knee-deep. The Commanding Officer (CO) of the 1st Battalion, East Lancashire Regiment described the fighting in the forest as a "terribly wearing business for the men. Psychologically and mentally. It was nearly all bayonet, Sten and grenade fighting. The Bosch reserves fought very well, stubborn and had to be dug out with the bayonet." Throughout Veritable the 53rd Division suffered almost 2,500 casualties (including psychiatric casualties), roughly a quarter of what they suffered throughout the entire campaign, while capturing over 3,000 prisoners.

The division, now under command of XII Corps, under Lieutenant-General Neil Ritchie, took part in Operation Plunder, the crossing of the Rhine, and advancing into Germany, where they ended the war. Throughout its 10 months of almost continuous combat, the 53rd (Welsh) Division had suffered nearly 10,000 casualties: 113 officers and 1,396 other ranks killed, 387 officers and 7,221 other ranks wounded and 33 officers and 1,255 other ranks missing. Of those declared missing, 3 officers and 553 other ranks rejoined their units, bringing the total casualties for the division to 9,849 killed, wounded or missing. As with most divisions, the majority of these casualties were sustained by the average "Tommy" in the infantry–nicknamed the PBI or "Poor Bloody Infantry"–who had sustained more than 80 percent of the total losses. According to Ross the division "captured some 35,000 prisoners of war and probably accounted for the same amount in dead and wounded."

Post-war
The division ended the war in 1945 in Hamburg. It served later as a peacekeeping force in the Rhineland, then disbanded to reform the 2nd Infantry Division in Germany in early 1947. It was reactivated later that year, serving as part of the peacetime TA. In 1961 the division became a district headquarters as 53rd (Welsh) Division/District, and it was disbanded in 1967. The district headquarters itself formed the core of the structure for the creation of Headquarters Wales under HQ UK Land Forces in 1972.

There remain a few remnants of the division in the TA. The 160th Brigade is the regional brigade responsible for the administration of all TA units in Wales, while 53 (Welsh) Signal Squadron is the descendant formation of 53rd (Welsh) Divisional Signal Regiment, and continues to serve in a very similar capacity, providing communications support to the 160th Brigade.

Victoria Cross recipients
 Captain Tasker Watkins, 1/5th Battalion, Welch Regiment, Second World War
 Refer to Monmouthshire Regiment section for Corporal Thomas Edward Chapman VC

General officers commanding

Orders of battle

See also

 List of British divisions in World War I
 List of British divisions in World War II
 British Army Order of Battle (September 1939)
 Independent Company

Notes

References

Bibliography

 
 
 
 
 
 
 
 
 Ward, Maj C.H. Dudley, History of the 53rd (Welsh) Division (T.F.) 1914–1918, Cardiff: Western Mail, 1927/Uckfield: Naval & Military, 2004, .
 
 
 Young, Lt-Col Michael, Army Service Corps 1902–1918, Barnsley: Leo Cooper, 2000, .

External links

 History of the 53rd (Welsh) division on memorial- montormel.org
 History of 555 Field Company Royal Engineers in WW2
 The Long, Long Trail
 The Regimental Warpath 1914–1918 (archive site)
 Mark Conrad, The British Army, 1914 (archive site)

Infantry divisions of the British Army in World War I
Infantry divisions of the British Army in World War II
Military units and formations established in 1908
Military units and formations disestablished in 1968
D53
1908 establishments in Wales
1968 disestablishments in Wales